The 2007–08 season was the 128th season of competitive football in England.

Club football

European competitions

In October 2007, Arsenal equalled the UEFA Champions League record victory with a 7–0 win over Slavia Prague at the Emirates Stadium. The record was broken the following month when Liverpool defeated Beşiktaş 8–0 at Anfield. All four English clubs competing in the Champions League reached the quarter-finals, resulting in three all-English ties during the competition's latter stages. Liverpool eliminated Arsenal in the quarter-finals, but lost the semi-final to Chelsea, who went on to meet Manchester United in the final in Moscow. United completed the European Double, winning the Premier League two points ahead of Chelsea and winning the UEFA Champions League, again against Chelsea 6–5 on penalties (1–1 after extra time) to lift the European Cup for the third time. This was a unique occurrence – the first time two English clubs had met in the final of the European Cup/Champions League. It was also a repeat of the opening game of the season, the FA Community Shield, which also finished 1–1 and saw a United win on penalties, 3–0.

In the UEFA Cup, none of the English teams taking part reached the quarter-final stage. Blackburn Rovers, who had qualified for the competition via the Intertoto Cup, were beaten in the first round by Larissa. The three other English clubs progressed through the group stages, with Bolton Wanderers losing to Sporting CP, while Tottenham Hotspur and Everton were both eliminated on penalty shootouts in the round of 16, by PSV Eindhoven and Fiorentina respectively. The 2008 UEFA Cup Final was held at the City of Manchester Stadium, the first time that the UEFA Cup Final had been held in England since being reduced to a single match. The event was marred by riots in Manchester city centre prior to the game. In the match itself, Zenit Saint Petersburg beat Rangers 2–0 to lift the trophy.

Premier League

Manchester United retained the Premier League title, winning the competition for the tenth time and becoming champions of England for the seventeenth time. The title was decided on the final day of the season as United's 2–0 win at Wigan Athletic saw them crowned champions and consigned Chelsea to the runners-up spot regardless of their result at home to Bolton Wanderers. Arsenal and Liverpool qualified for the UEFA Champions League 2008–09 third qualifying round by finishing third and fourth respectively, while Everton's fifth position gave them a place in the 2008–09 UEFA Cup first round. Reading, Birmingham City and Derby County were relegated. Derby became the first team in Premier League history to be relegated before the end of March. They eventually finished on the lowest Premier League points tally ever, amassing only eleven points and winning just one game all season.

The Premier League underwent a major rebranding; changing its sponsored name from the Barclays Premiership to the Barclays Premier League, introducing a revamped logo and new typeface for players' jerseys.

Football League

Championship
After the disappointment of a play-off final defeat the previous year, West Bromwich Albion won the Football League Championship title and returned to the Premier League. Stoke City secured the other automatic promotion spot, ending a 23-year absence from the top flight. Hull City followed them by winning the play-off final, beating Bristol City 1–0 at Wembley Stadium in the final to reach the top division of English football for the first time in their 104-year history. It was the first time that Hull had played at either the original or rebuilt Wembley Stadium. Despite impressing on their Championship debut in 2006–07, Colchester United finished bottom this season and were relegated back to League One. Scunthorpe United's first journey into the Championship since the 1960s proved short-lived, and they also went back down. The biggest story however was Leicester City's relegation, as a lack of stability at the club (with no fewer than eight men, including caretakers, occupying the manager's seat over the season) proved their undoing and sent them down to the third tier for the first time in their history.

League One
In a season mired by controversy and points deductions at both ends of the table, Swansea City were the clear champions in League One. In terms of results, Leeds United were actually the best team behind Swansea, but had started the season on –15 points following their failure to reach an agreement with HM Revenue & Customs on their Creditors Voluntary Arrangement. This was the first time in the league's history that such a penalty had been imposed. Nottingham Forest therefore took the second automatic promotion spot on the final day of the season after a late surge of form, culminating in Forest defeating Yeovil 3–2 (Who ironically defeated them in the play-off semi-final the previous season). Doncaster Rovers won promotion to the Championship by beating Leeds 1–0 at Wembley Stadium in the League One play-off final, thus returning to the top two tiers for the first time since 1958. At the opposite end of the table, Port Vale were in fact the worst team going by results, but Luton Town went into administration and were deducted ten points causing them to finish bottom, though they would have been relegated even without this penalty. AFC Bournemouth also received a ten-point deduction for going into administration, and in their case it did prove fatal, sending the club down to League Two. If the points deduction did not occur, then Crewe would have gone down. Gillingham were the other team to suffer relegation.

League Two
Milton Keynes Dons won their first honours as a club, winning the League Two title and the Football League Trophy. The other clubs automatically promoted were runners-up Peterborough United, who had pushed the Dons close for most of the season, and Hereford United, who returned to the third level of English football for the first time in thirty years. Stockport County won promotion to League One by beating Rochdale 3–2 at Wembley Stadium in the League Two play-off final. There was to be no repeat of Wrexham's last day heroics of the 2006–07 season, and this time they finished bottom and went out of the League. Despite a good run late in the season, Mansfield Town joined them. Both Dagenham & Redbridge and Morecambe played in the Football League for the first time, after securing promotion to League Two from the Conference.

Cup competitions and Community Shield

Portsmouth won the FA Cup with a 1–0 victory over Cardiff City. Tottenham Hotspur won the League Cup, beating the holders Chelsea 2–1 after extra time. It was the first League Cup final to be played at the new Wembley Stadium. MK Dons won the Football League Trophy after beating Grimsby Town 2–0 in the final. Manchester United took the first silverware of the season when they beat Chelsea 3–0 on penalties in the FA Community Shield.

Non-League football

The Conference National became known as the Blue Square Premier upon the announcement of a three-year sponsorship deal. The two regional feeder leagues became known as the Blue Square North and South respectively. The deal signalled the end of a nine-year association between the Conference and the Nationwide Building Society. Aldershot Town won the Conference National to gain automatic promotion to the Football League, while Exeter City beat Cambridge United 1–0 in the play-off final at Wembley Stadium to secure the other promotion place. Aldershot also won the Conference League Cup, beating Rushden & Diamonds in a penalty shootout after a 3–3 draw. The FA Trophy was won by Ebbsfleet United, who beat Torquay United 1–0 at Wembley.

Events off the field
Deloitte reported in September 2007 that transfer spending by all Premier League and Football League clubs had exceeded £500 million, compared to £300 million spent the season before. Deloitte attributed the rise in spending to the huge increase in broadcasting revenue and new owners buying into Premier League clubs.

Two league clubs moved to new grounds for 2007–08. Shrewsbury Town moved to the New Meadow for the start of this season, after leaving their old stadium, Gay Meadow. Milton Keynes Dons moved to their new 22,000 all seater stadium at Denbigh, Milton Keynes, known as Stadium:mk. The stadium was officially opened on 29 November 2007 by Queen Elizabeth.

Sheffield, the world's oldest football club, celebrated their 150th anniversary; events included a friendly match against Inter Milan.

Diary of the season

1 July 2007: Tottenham Hotspur pay a club record £16.5 million for Charlton Athletic striker Darren Bent.

2 July 2007: Manchester United shell out a combined total of £30 million for Brazilian midfielder Anderson (from Porto) and Portuguese winger Nani (from Sporting CP).

4 July 2007: Everton pay £4 million for Sheffield United defender Phil Jagielka.

5 July 2007: Aston Villa sign West Ham United midfielder Nigel Reo-Coker for £8.5 million.

10 July 2007: West Ham United pay a club record £7.5 million for Liverpool striker Craig Bellamy, while Wigan Athletic break their own record fee with a £5.3 million deal for West Bromwich Albion midfielder Jason Koumas.

13 July 2007: Liverpool pay £11.5 million to Ajax for winger Ryan Babel.

23 July 2007: Freddie Ljungberg, Arsenal's longest-serving player, leaves after nearly nine years in a £3 million move to West Ham United.

24 July 2007: Robbie Fowler leaves Liverpool for a second time to join Cardiff City on a free transfer.

3 August 2007: Manchester United sell striker Alan Smith to Newcastle United for £6 million.

4 August 2007: Leeds United, who have spent the summer on the brink of expulsion from the Football League due to their financial problems, are told that they will be allowed to take their place in League One, but will start on –15 points for exiting administration without a CVA. Leeds chairman Ken Bates immediately announces his intention to appeal against the penalty.

5 August 2007: Manchester United beat Chelsea on penalties after a 1–1 draw to seal the Community Shield at Wembley Stadium.

15 August 2007: Long-serving Aston Villa defender Mark Delaney retires from playing at the age of 31 after failing to fully recover from a succession of injuries.

25 August 2007: Ray Jones, 18-year-old Queens Park Rangers striker, dies in a car crash in east London which claims the lives of two other people.

28 August 2007: Manchester United's long-serving Norwegian striker Ole Gunnar Solskjær retires from playing at the age of 34.

29 August 2007: Martin Allen, who was appointed manager of Leicester City only three months ago, is dismissed from his job. Everton pay a club record £11.25 million to Middlesbrough for striker Yakubu.

31 August 2007: August ends with Chelsea top after four matches and looking to reclaim their title from Manchester United, who currently stand 10th after a slow start. Manchester City and Wigan Athletic are surprise members of the current top four, along with Liverpool. Everton, Arsenal and Newcastle United complete the top seven while Bolton Wanderers, Fulham and Derby County make up the relegation zone. In the Championship, Coventry City and Ipswich Town are joint leaders of the division while Wolverhampton Wanderers, Stoke City, recently relegated Watford and Colchester United stand in the play-offs. The table is propped up by QPR, Preston North End and Sheffield Wednesday.

11 September 2007: Ian Porterfield, who scored the winning goal for Sunderland in the 1973 FA Cup Final, dies of cancer aged 61. Porterfield was managing Armenia at the time of his death, and earlier in his management career he had been in charge of teams including Sheffield United and Chelsea.

13 September 2007: Gary Megson, former West Bromwich Albion and Nottingham Forest manager, ends his 18-month exile from football to take over at Leicester City.

20 September 2007: José Mourinho, who in the last three years has guided Chelsea to two Premier League titles, two League Cups and an FA Cup triumph, resigns as manager after falling out with owner Roman Abramovich. Director of Football Avram Grant takes over control of the first team, becoming the first Israeli manager in English football.

30 September 2007: At the end of September Arsenal have leaped to the top of the Premiership, followed closely by Manchester United. Manchester City are making a surprise title push and stand in third, while Liverpool, Everton, Portsmouth and Blackburn Rovers are also attempting to make their mark in the push for Europe. Tottenham Hotspur, Bolton and Derby are joint bottom of the Premiership, although Derby's vastly inferior goal difference makes them appear the most vulnerable of the three sides. In the Championship, Watford and Charlton Athletic, relegated from the Premiership last season, are pushing for an immediate return to the top flight and stand first and third respectively, sandwiching West Bromwich Albion. Newly promoted sides Bristol City (4th) and Scunthorpe United (6th) are pushing for a second consecutive promotion, while fifth-placed Stoke City are pushing for a return to the top tier after a 20-year absence. The same three teams from August stand in the bottom three, although now QPR has dropped below Preston and Sheffield Wednesday to stand bottom.

8 October 2007: Peter Taylor is sacked as manager of Crystal Palace after just 16 months in charge.

11 October 2007: Neil Warnock returns to management with Crystal Palace, just five months after leaving Sheffield United.

17 October 2007: Bolton Wanderers, bottom of the Premier League, sack manager Sammy Lee after six months in charge.

19 October 2007: Steve Bruce resigns after six years as manager of Birmingham City. Speculations mounts that he is about to take over from Chris Hutchings as manager of Wigan Athletic, where he had a brief spell in 2001.

25 October 2007: Gary Megson defects from Leicester City after six weeks as manager to take over at Bolton Wanderers, while Martin Jol is sacked as manager of Tottenham Hotspur (battling relegation from the Premier League after two successive fifth-place finishes) after three years.

31 October 2007: Arsenal are continuing their bid for a first title in four years and finish October joint top with Manchester United, but with a game in hand. Manchester City are also continuing their push for European qualification and stand in third, although they are facing pressure from Chelsea, Blackburn, Liverpool and Portsmouth. The relegation zone is unchanged from the end of September, although only three points separate 14th-placed Fulham from 20th-placed Derby. In the Championship, Watford stand six points clear of nearest challengers Bristol City and look well placed for a quick return to the Premiership, while West Brom, Ipswich, Wolves and Stoke (joint sixth with Plymouth Argyle) compete for the play-off places. Norwich City now prop up the Championship, and are three points adrift of the nearest two sides, QPR and Crystal Palace.

5 November 2007: Chris Hutchings is sacked as manager of Premier League strugglers Wigan Athletic after less than six months in charge.

21 November 2007: England fail to qualify for Euro 2008 after losing 3–2 to Croatia in their final qualifying game at Wembley Stadium.

22 November 2007: Steve McClaren is dismissed as England manager by The Football Association after 16 months in charge.

26 November 2007: Billy Davies is sacked as manager of Derby County, bottom of the Premier League with just one win so far.

28 November 2007: Paul Jewell returns to management with Derby County, six months after leaving Wigan Athletic. Alex McLeish resigns as Scotland manager to take over at Birmingham City.

30 November 2007: Arsenal finish November three points ahead of Manchester United with a game still in hand, although only seven points separate Arsenal from seventh-placed Portsmouth, and the teams in between – United, Manchester City, Chelsea, Liverpool and Aston Villa – all look capable of sustaining a title bid if they can string together a few good results. Derby remain bottom of the Premiership, but are now joined in the bottom three by Wigan and Sunderland. In the Championship, West Brom have cut Watford's lead to only two points. Charlton have recovered from a poor October to stand third, joined in the top six by Wolves, Ipswich and Bristol City. Norwich remain bottom, along with Preston, but are now only a point adrift of 21st-placed Blackpool, who lead QPR only by goal difference.

14 December 2007: Fabio Capello, 61-year-old Italian who has achieved great success with several top European clubs, accepts an offer from The Football Association (FA) to take charge of the England team.

21 December 2007: Premier League strugglers Fulham sack manager Lawrie Sanchez after eight months in charge.

29 December 2007: Phil O'Donnell, former Sheffield Wednesday midfielder, dies from a heart attack during a Scottish Premier League game for Motherwell.

30 December 2007: Roy Hodgson returns to English football, nine years after being sacked by Blackburn Rovers, to take over as Fulham manager.

31 December 2007: The year closes with Arsenal still top, although they have failed to take advantage of their game in hand and are only two points clear of Manchester United. It appears now that the title will end up either at Old Trafford or the Emirates – Chelsea, Liverpool, Manchester City, Everton and Aston Villa appear to be now competing just for European qualification. At the other end of the table, Derby are ten points adrift of safety and look certain for relegation. They are joined in the drop zone by Wigan and Fulham. A division below, West Brom have leapfrogged Watford into first. Bristol City are ramping up the pressure on their Hertfordshire rivals and are below them only by goal difference. Stoke, Charlton and Plymouth complete the top six. Norwich have escaped the relegation zone after a good run of results and their local rivals Colchester now prop up the table, along with Sheffield Wednesday and Preston.

7 January 2008: Fabio Capello officially takes over as England manager.

9 January 2008: Sam Allardyce is sacked after eight months in charge of Newcastle United.

11 January 2008: Chelsea pay Bolton Wanderers £15 million for French striker Nicolas Anelka.

16 January 2008: Kevin Keegan is appointed manager of Newcastle United for the second time, having previously been their manager from 1992 until 1997.

24 January 2008: George Burley quits Southampton to take over as Scotland manager.

29 January 2008: Dennis Wise resigns as manager of Leeds United (who replace him with former captain Gary McAllister) to become executive director of Newcastle United.

30 January 2008: Tottenham Hotspur pay £9 million for Rangers and Scotland defender Alan Hutton.

31 January 2008: Manchester United lead Arsenal by goal difference as January closes, although Chelsea have undergone a renaissance under Avram Grant and are only four points off the Premiership summit. The West London club are ten points clear of fourth-placed Everton, who, along with Aston Villa, Manchester City and Liverpool, are now competing for the final Champions League place. The relegation zone is unchanged from the end of December. West Brom and Bristol City are joint top of the Championship, with Watford, Stoke, Charlton and Crystal Palace in the top six and Preston, Scunthorpe and Colchester in the bottom three.

6 February 2008: England beat Switzerland 2–1 in a home friendly in Fabio Capello's first game in charge.

24 February 2008: Tottenham Hotspur end their nine-year trophy drought with a 2–1 win over Chelsea in the Football League Cup final.

28 February 2008: Arsenal have regained their three-point advantage over Manchester United at the top of the Premiership, with Chelsea nine points behind their London rivals in third. Everton, Liverpool, Aston Villa and Portsmouth continue their European push. At the other end of the table, Derby are 14 points adrift of safety and appear effectively relegated. With eleven games left to play, Reading and Fulham join the Midlands club in the bottom three. In the Championship, Stoke have jumped to the top of the table and are fighting with Bristol City and Watford for the Football League title. West Brom, Plymouth and Charlton compete for the play-off places. The Championship relegation zone is unchanged.

1 March 2008: Colchester United's former England striker Teddy Sheringham, who turns 42 next month and is the oldest professional footballer in the country, announces that he will retire from playing at the end of the season, calling time on a 26-year playing career.

29 March 2008: Derby County's relegation is confirmed after they can only manage a 2–2 draw at home to fellow Premier League strugglers Fulham – the earliest relegation to be confirmed in all 16 seasons of the Premier League.

31 March 2008: Manchester United have established a five-point lead over Chelsea with six games left to play; Arsenal have suffered a slump in form and are in third. Liverpool have also established a five-point lead, but ahead of Everton in the race for the final Champions League place. Everton, Portsmouth and Blackburn now appear to be competing for UEFA Cup qualification. For Fulham and Bolton the challenge is to escape the drop zone, although with only six games left their hopes are becoming increasingly slimmer. Derby are already relegated and are playing now only to avoid breaking Sunderland's record, set two seasons ago, of the lowest points tally ever accrued in a Premiership season. In the Championship, only two points separate Bristol City, Stoke and a Hull City side making a late bid for promotion, although West Brom are only four points off the top with two games in hand. Watford and Wolves make up the rest of the top six. Colchester United appear doomed, being thirteen points behind 21st-placed Southampton with only fifteen left to play for. Scunthorpe United, while above Colchester, also seem destined for the drop. Sheffield Wednesday, however, are only a point behind Southampton and with two games in hand they still have a good chance of survival.

29 April 2008: Tottenham Hotspur match their club record fee with a £16.5 million move for Dinamo Zagreb and Croatia midfielder Luka Modrić.

30 April 2008: With two matches left, Manchester United and Chelsea are level on 81 points; Arsenal are four points behind and look like they will be settling for third. Liverpool have sealed their fourth-place finish, while Everton seem destined for fifth despite late pressure from Aston Villa and Portsmouth. Derby have confirmed their 20th-place finish, but Fulham and Birmingham City are still hopeful of securing their top-flight survival at the expense of Reading, Bolton or Middlesbrough. The Championship has one round of matches left to play: West Brom's superior goal difference makes it likely that they will be automatically promoted, barring a 12-goal swing in the favour of third placed Hull. Second placed Stoke need to avoid defeat or hope that Hull loses on the final day to seal automatic promotion. Bristol City have sealed their place in the play-offs, while Watford, Crystal Palace, Wolves, Ipswich and Sheffield United fight for the final two play-off spots. Scunthorpe and Colchester are relegated, while Southampton are 22nd, but Leicester, Sheffield Wednesday, Coventry and Blackpool could all still be relegated.

11 May 2008: Manchester United seal their 10th Premier League title and their 17th top division title overall by beating Wigan Athletic at the JJB Stadium in Wigan, while Derby County finish the season in bottom place with a record top division low of one win and 11 points. Joining them in the Football League Championship for next season are Birmingham City and Reading.

12 May 2008: Porto and Portugal defender José Bosingwa agrees to join Chelsea in a £16.2 million deal.

17 May 2008: Portsmouth's 58-year wait for a major trophy ends with a 1–0 win over Cardiff City in the FA Cup final. Nwankwo Kanu scores the only goal of the game.

21 May 2008: In the first all-English Champions League final, Manchester United beat Chelsea on penalties after a 1–1 draw in Moscow. Edwin van der Sar saves Nicolas Anelka's penalty kick to give the trophy to United, while earlier in the shoot-out John Terry misses the penalty that would have given Chelsea the trophy for the very first time.

24 May 2008: Hull City reach the top flight for the first time in their history with a 1–0 win over Bristol City in the Football League Championship play-off final, with 39-year-old striker Dean Windass scoring the winning goal. It is Hull's third promotion in five seasons – the second-quickest rise from the league's fourth tier to the highest. On the same day, Avram Grant is sacked as manager of Chelsea (without a major trophy for the first time in four years) despite having taken them to the brink of Premier League and Champions League glory this season.

25 May 2008: Doncaster Rovers reach the second tier of the English league for the first time in 50 years with a 1–0 win over Leeds United in the League One playoff final. Just six years ago, Leeds were a top-five Premier League club playing European football, while Doncaster were still in the Conference.

2 June 2008: Sven-Göran Eriksson is sacked after one season as manager of Manchester City.

5 June 2008: Mark Hughes leaves Blackburn Rovers after four years to take over at Manchester City.

7 June 2008: Plymouth Argyle goalkeeper Luke McCormick, 24, is involved in a car crash on the M6 motorway in Cheshire in which two children are killed and four other people are injured.

22 June 2008: Paul Ince becomes manager of Blackburn Rovers, ending his season-long spell in charge of Milton Keynes Dons (where he won the League Two title and the Football League Trophy.

Clubs Removed
 Halifax Town (Conference National)

Managerial changes

Notes
1 Downing was previously caretaker manager after Ward's departure.
2 Scott was previously caretaker manager after Butcher's departure.
3 Harford was named caretaker manager for the remainder of the season.
4 Blackwell was named caretaker manager for the remainder of the season.
5 Davies' caretaker role was extended until the end of the season.
6 Holland's caretaker role was extended until the end of the season.
7 Mullen was previously caretaker manager after Money's departure.

Promotion and relegation

Playoff winners in bold.

Premier League
Champions: Manchester United
Champions League 2008–09 Qualifiers : Manchester United, Chelsea, Arsenal and Liverpool
UEFA Cup 2008–09 Qualifiers : Tottenham Hotspur, Everton, Manchester City and Portsmouth
Relegated to The Championship : Derby County, Birmingham City and Reading

Championship
Champions: West Bromwich Albion
Promoted: Stoke City
Playoffs : Hull City, Bristol City, Watford and Crystal Palace
Relegated: Leicester City, Scunthorpe United and Colchester United

League One
Champions: Swansea City
Promoted: Nottingham Forest
Playoffs : Doncaster Rovers, Leeds United, Southend United and Carlisle United
Relegated: AFC Bournemouth, Gillingham, Port Vale and Luton Town

League Two
Champions: Milton Keynes Dons
Promoted: Peterborough United, Hereford United
Playoffs : Stockport County, Rochdale, Darlington and Wycombe Wanderers
Relegated: Mansfield Town and Wrexham

Conference National
Champions: Aldershot Town
Play-offs: Cambridge United, Torquay United, Exeter City and Burton Albion
Relegated: Altrincham*, Farsley Celtic, Stafford Rangers and Droylsden
Promoted to: Kettering Town, Lewes, Eastbourne Borough and Barrow

*Altrincham avoided relegation after Halifax Town went into liquidation

National team
England played their first international match on a synthetic pitch against Russia. England lost the game 2–1 leaving qualification for UEFA Euro 2008 out of their hands. England failed to qualify for Euro 2008 after losing 3–2 to Croatia on 21 November 2007. As a result, England manager Steve McClaren was sacked the following day. Fabio Capello was confirmed as the new England manager on 14 December 2007. Capello was unveiled by the FA on 17 December 2007, and took up his new role on 7 January 2008.

Friendly matches
The home team is listed on the left; the visiting one on the right.

Euro 2008 qualifiers

League tables

Premier League

Manchester United were crowned league champions for the second year in succession, the tenth time in the history of the Premier League and the 17th time overall. They also won the European Cup/UEFA Champions League for the third time, and Cristiano Ronaldo finished as the league's top scorer with 31 goals. While all three of their main rivals kept the battle for the title close, Chelsea had the more dramatic season; influential manager José Mourinho departed in mid-September and was replaced by Avram Grant, who became the first Chelsea manager in four years to go without a trophy. Arsenal, meanwhile, after two seasons of disappointment, finished third, just missing out on the title by four points. Completing the top four was Liverpool, which ensured that the same four teams qualified for Europe's elite competition once again.

Everton and Aston Villa occupied the two qualification places for the UEFA Cup as managers David Moyes and Martin O'Neill continued to impress for their respective sides (Villa qualified for the Intertoto Cup), whilst Portsmouth collected their first piece of silverware in 58 years by winning the FA Cup in their most successful season ever. Tottenham shook off the shock sacking of Martin Jol with newly installed Juande Ramos winning them their first trophy in nine years in the League Cup and ensuring a third consecutive year of UEFA Cup qualification, even if their league form was far from stellar.

Manchester City went into the season with high expectations, with a new owner in Thaksin Shinawatra and a new manager in Sven-Göran Eriksson, alongside an influx of new talent, but finished 9th after suffering from inconsistent form at the turn of the year. Eriksson then lost his job at the end of the season, which included an 8–1 loss to Middlesbrough on the final day. Newcastle welcomed the returning Kevin Keegan as manager after sacking Sam Allardyce, and while a winless run from Boxing Day left them four points off the relegation places in mid-March, the Magpies secured safety by winning four of their next seven games.

Newly promoted Derby County, twice champions of the old First Division, were relegated straight back to the Championship after just one season in the Premier League, winning just one game and collecting a mere eleven points all season; the team's season broke records for all the wrong reasons as they had the worst goal difference, the lowest number of goals scored in the top flight and the earliest post-war relegation. Their relegation was effectively confirmed when manager Billy Davies stood down in November. The departure of long-serving manager Steve Bruce and subsequent appointment of Alex McLeish meant that Birmingham were relegated after a single season back in the top flight. Taking the final relegation spot were Reading, who seemed safe until the last few weeks of the season, and only a year after narrowly missing out on a European spot. Fulham narrowly survived on goal difference, seemingly dead and buried until the final few games, the appointment of Roy Hodgson, who returned to English football after nine years managing in Europe, saw significant improvement enabling them to escape the drop.

Leading goalscorer: Cristiano Ronaldo (Manchester United) – 31

Football League Championship

West Bromwich Albion won the Championship title and sealed promotion to the Premier League after a two-year absence. Stoke City joined them, clinching promotion on the last day of the season and returning to the top flight of English football after an absence of 23 years. Hull City reached the top flight for the first time in their history after beating Bristol City 1–0 in the playoff final, marking their third promotion in five seasons having battled relegation last season. Bristol City had actually led the table at several points of the season but nonetheless their fourth-place finish proved a far cry from being the relegation favourites many had tipped them for.

Wolverhampton Wanderers narrowly missed out on the play-offs on goal difference to a Watford side who actually led the league for most of the first half of the campaign but won just one of their last sixteen to sneak into the playoffs, with not even the arrival of top scorer Sylvan Ebanks-Blake helping Wolves' cause. Ipswich Town lost just once at home but missed out despite a final day win over Hull. Crystal Palace initially looked in danger of relegation until the appointment of Neil Warnock in October saw them climb the table and clinch a play-off spot at the expense of his old club Sheffield United.

Colchester United could not build on last season's tenth-place finish and were relegated back to League One in bottom place after two years in this league. Scunthorpe United's return to the second tier was short lived as they made an immediate return to League One. Leicester City went down on the final day despite drawing at Stoke, after Southampton beat Sheffield United to move above them. It meant that the Foxes would spend next season playing in the third tier of English football for the first time in their history, the employment of four permanent managers throughout the season saw them finally hit rock-bottom after several years of struggle and managerial changes. Sheffield Wednesday, Coventry City and Blackpool also all survived on the last day, in Coventry's case despite losing 4–1 at Charlton.

Leading goalscorer: Sylvan Ebanks-Blake (Wolverhampton Wanderers) – 23

Football League One

Swansea City won the League One title after amassing 92 points, the highest by a Welsh club in the Football League. Nottingham Forest moved back up to the Championship after a three-season absence, winning six of their last seven and snatching promotion from Doncaster Rovers on the final day. Doncaster made amends for missing out on automatic promotion by winning the playoffs to enter the Championship after a half century absence from the second tier.

Leeds United's record would have seen them promoted at the expense of Forest, but they were cost dear by a 15-point deduction that was imposed pre-season after their failure to agree a deal with their creditors almost resulted in the club being ejected from the Football League entirely, and while they did wipe the deduction out with a 13-match unbeaten run to start the campaign, they lost to Doncaster in the playoff final, ending their hopes of an immediate return to the Championship. Carlisle proved to be the surprise package however and remained in contention for 2nd place until the final day, narrowly losing to Leeds in the play-offs.

Luton Town suffered their second consecutive relegation as they finished bottom and sat in administration for the entire season, resulting in a ten-point deduction. Port Vale, who were statistically the worst team in the division, joined them. Gillingham were relegated on the last day of the season, as were Bournemouth, the latter of whom also entered administration and suffered a ten-point deduction which proved fatal. Crewe narrowly escaped relegation courtesy of Bournemouth's points deduction and despite losing 4–1 on the final day. Cheltenham avoided the drop in part to their final day win that also cost Doncaster automatic promotion.

Leading goalscorer: Jason Scotland (Swansea City) – 24

Football League Two

MK Dons won the League Two title, returning to the third tier after a two-season absence and earning their first major achievement in their four-year history. New boss Darren Ferguson led Peterborough United to promotion as runners-up. Hereford United also climbed out of the bottom division meaning they would be playing third tier football for first time in thirty years next season. The final promotion place went to Stockport County, who won the playoffs.

At the bottom, Wrexham lost their 87-year League status. Mansfield Town had a good FA Cup run but could not cope in the league and were also relegated out of the league after 77 years.

Entering the Football League for the following season were Aldershot Town (the successor of the original Aldershot that folded during the 1991–92 season) and Exeter City, who returned after five years away.

Leading goalscorer: Aaron McLean (Peterborough United) – 29

Transfer deals

Retirements
 5 July 2007 – Chris Sutton (Aston Villa)
 26 July 2007 – Matt Piper (ex Sunderland)
3 August 2007 – Charlie Oatway (Brighton & Hove Albion)
15 August 2007 – Mark Delaney (Aston Villa)
28 August 2007 – Ole Gunnar Solskjær (Manchester United)
28 August 2007 – David Woozley (Crawley Town)
30 August 2007 – Neal Ardley (Millwall)
11 September 2007 – James Quinn (Northampton Town)
7 December 2007 – Phil Gilchrist (Oxford United)
2 January 2008 – Mark Goodlad (Port Vale)
16 January 2008 – Juan Ugarte (Wrexham)
7 February 2008 – John Hartson (West Bromwich Albion)
12 March 2008 – Tore André Flo (Leeds United)
25 March 2008 – Claus Lundekvam (Southampton)
End of season – Dion Dublin (Norwich City)
End of season – Teddy Sheringham (Colchester United)
End of season – David Wetherall (Bradford City)
End of season – Neil Young (AFC Bournemouth)
End of season – Alan Thompson (Leeds United)

Deaths
3 July 2007 – Dave Simmons, 58, former striker who played for Aston Villa, Colchester United, Brentford and Cambridge United. Perhaps best known for scoring the decisive goal in Colchester's upset win against Leeds United in the 1971 FA Cup.
20 July 2007 – David Preece, 44, former midfielder, most notably at Luton Town, where he played 11 seasons and won the League Cup in 1988. Began his career at Walsall, and also played for Derby County, Cambridge United and Torquay United.
24 July 2007 – Eric Davis, 75, former Plymouth Argyle, Scunthorpe United and Chester City striker.
25 July 2007 – Danny Bergara, 65, Uruguayan who was one of the first Football League managers born outside the British Isles, and the first to lead out an English side at Wembley. Managed several clubs in the lower leagues, and most notably won promotion to the old Third Division with Stockport County in 1991.
16 August 2007 – Jeroen Boere, 39, Dutch striker who played for West Ham United, Crystal Palace and Southend United in the late 1990s.
25 August 2007 – Ray Jones, 18, Queens Park Rangers striker, killed in a car accident.
31 August 2007 – Willie Cunningham, 77, former Leicester City defender who played for Northern Ireland in the 1958 FIFA World Cup.
6 September 2007 – Byron Stevenson, 50, former Leeds United, Birmingham City and Bristol Rovers defender who also won 15 caps for Wales.
7 September 2007 – Norman Deeley, 73, former Wolverhampton Wanderers winger who scored twice in the 1960 FA Cup Final, and won two caps for England. Also played for Leyton Orient.
11 September 2007 – Ian Porterfield, 61, former Sunderland midfielder who scored the winning goal in the 1973 FA Cup Final. Later became a successful manager, managing Chelsea, Reading, Sheffield United and various other clubs and national teams. Was managing Armenia at the time of his death.
14 September 2007 – Malcolm Musgrove, 74, former West Ham United and Leyton Orient winger. Played more than 300 games for the Hammers, and later manager Torquay United and several teams in the United States. Died from Alzheimer's disease.
20 September 2007 – Johnny Gavin, 79, former striker who is Norwich City's all-time top goalscorer. Also played for Tottenham Hotspur, Watford and Crystal Palace, and won seven caps for the Republic of Ireland.
27 September 2007 – Bill Perry, 77, former Blackpool winger who scored the winning goal in the 1953 FA Cup Final, and played three times for England despite being born in South Africa.
15 October 2007 – Jackie Little, 95, former Ipswich Town winger who spent 15 years at Portman Road and played in the club's first-ever league match in 1938.
19 October 2007 – Michael Maidens, 20, Hartlepool United midfielder, killed in a car accident.
13 November 2007 – John Doherty, 72, former Busby Babe who played as an inside-forward for Manchester United and later Leicester City in the 1950s.
18 November 2007 – Joe Shaw, 79, former Sheffield United defender; the club's all-time record appearance holder with 629 league matches for the Blades.
19 November 2007 – Ken Leek, 72, former Welsh international striker, who won the 1963 League Cup with Birmingham City; also played for Northampton Town, Leicester City, Newcastle United and Bradford City.
19 November 2007 – Graham Paddon, 57, former Norwich City and West Ham United midfielder; 1975 FA Cup winner.
2 December 2007 – Les Shannon, 81, played as a winger for Liverpool and Burnley in the 1950s; later managed Bury, Blackpool and several clubs in Greece, most notably Olympiakos.
7 December 2007 – John Hollowbread, 73, former Tottenham Hotspur and Southampton goalkeeper.
9 December 2007 – Jim Langley, 78, full-back who spent the bulk of his career at Fulham (1957–1965), where he won three England caps. Also played for Leeds United, Brighton & Hove Albion and Queens Park Rangers.
11 December 2007 – Ray Goddard, 58, goalkeeper who played for Leyton Orient, Millwall and Wimbledon between 1967 and 1981. Was a member of three promotion-winning sides during his career.
13 December 2007 – Harry Kirtley, 77, former Sunderland, Cardiff City and Gateshead forward.
15 December 2007 – Jimmy O'Neill, 76, former Republic of Ireland international goalkeeper who played club football for Everton, Stoke, Darlington and Port Vale.
25 December 2007 – Tommy Harmer, 79, inside-forward for Tottenham Hotspur in the 1950s. Later played for Watford and Chelsea before moving into coaching.
27 December 2007 – Brian Lambert, 71, former Mansfield Town full-back.
29 December 2007 – Phil O'Donnell, 35, Motherwell midfielder who spent four seasons at Sheffield Wednesday in the early 2000s (decade). Won one cap for Scotland during his first spell at Motherwell in the early 1990s, and had scored for Motherwell in the 1991 Scottish Cup final. Collapsed on the pitch during a Scottish league match, and died later that evening.
9 January 2008 – Paul Aimson, 64, former striker who spent the majority of his career at York City, scoring more than 100 goals.
14 January 2008 – Johnny Steele, 91, former inside-forward who spent more than half a century at Barnsley as player, coach, manager, secretary and director. He is Barnsley's longest-serving manager.
18 January 2008 – Wally Fielding, 88, former Everton inside-forward who played more than 400 games for the Toffees. At the time of his death he was believed to be the oldest living former Everton player.
21 January 2008 – Billy Elliott, 82, former Sunderland winger who won five England caps. Also played for Bradford Park Avenue and Burnley, and later became manager of Darlington. He also managed Norwegian side Brann and the Libyan national team.
c. 1 February 2008 – Johnny Edgar, 71, former Barnsley, Gillingham, York City, Hartlepool United and Exeter City striker; scorer of York's fastest-ever hat-trick (three goals in six minutes against Accrington Stanley in 1959).
7 February 2008 – Frank Wayman, 76, former winger who played briefly at the professional level with Chester City and Darlington. Died after being struck by a motorcycle.
14 February 2008 – Len Boyd, 84, former Plymouth Argyle, Birmingham City and England B wing half. Captained Birmingham to 1954–55 promotion and the 1956 FA Cup Final.
17 February 2008 – Brian Harris, 72, versatile former Everton, Cardiff City and Newport County player who played at every position on the pitch except goalkeeper during his career; also managed Newport.
26 February 2008 – Jimmy Dugdale, 76, former West Bromwich Albion, Aston Villa and England B defender. Won the FA Cup twice; with WBA in 1954 and with Villa in 1957.
2 March 2008 – Carl Hoddle, 40, former Barnet and Leyton Orient midfielder; brother of Glenn Hoddle.
5 March 2008 – Derek Dooley, 78, legendary Sheffield Wednesday striker who scored 62 goals in 61 games for the Owls before having his leg amputated in 1953 following a serious injury. He also played for Lincoln City, and later managed Sheffield Wednesday (1971–1973) before joining city rivals Sheffield United where he held a number of jobs, including commercial manager and chairman.
8 March 2008 – Les Smith, 80, former Wolverhampton and Aston Villa winger; member of Aston Villa's 1957 FA Cup winning side.
24 March 2008 – John Cushley, 65, Scottish defender who spent three seasons at West Ham United in the late 1960s, and also played for Celtic, Dunfermline and Dumbarton north of the border. Worked as a teacher outside football.
24 March 2008 – Ray Drinkwater, 76, former Queens Park Rangers goalkeeper.
29 April 2008 – Gordon Bradley, 74, former Carlisle United wing-half who later became an American citizen, where he played for a number of teams including the New York Cosmos, and won one cap for the U.S. national team. He also served as head coach of Cosmos and later the Washington Diplomats of the NASL.
1 May 2008 – Mark Kendall, 49, former goalkeeper who played for Tottenham Hotspur, Newport County, Wolverhampton Wanderers and Swansea City. Capped by Wales at Under-21 level.
6 May 2008 – John Reames, 66, former Lincoln City chairman and manager.
15 May 2008 – Tommy Burns, 51, former Scottish international midfielder who served 18 months as Reading manager in the late 1990s. Spent his playing career north of the border, for Celtic and Kilmarnock.
19 May 2008 – Nigel Cassidy, 62, former striker who began his professional career at Norwich City, and later played for Scunthorpe, Oxford and Cambridge.
20 May 2008 – Lord Tom Burlison, 71, former Hartlepool United wing-half and honorary life president. Also played for Lincoln City and Darlington. After his football career, he became a trade union leader and Labour peer.
24 May 2008 – Reg Flewin, 87, former Portsmouth defender, who captained his hometown side to the 1948–49 and 1949–50 league titles, and also won one wartime cap for England.
28 May 2008 – John Hulme, 63, former Bolton Wanderers, Reading and Bury defender.
12 June 2008 – Derek Tapscott, 75, former Welsh international striker who played for Arsenal, Cardiff City, Newport County, and several non-league clubs.
19 June 2008 – Tim Carter, 40, former goalkeeper at Sunderland, Bristol Rovers, Hartlepool United, Millwall and several other clubs. Was Sunderland's goalkeeping coach at the time of his death.
22 June 2008 – Ron Stitfall, 82, former Cardiff City defender who played more than 400 games for the Bluebirds. He also won two caps for Wales.
23 June 2008 – Mick Hill, 60, former Sheffield United, Ipswich Town and Crystal Palace forward who also played twice for Wales.

References